Melvin Erskine Thomason (born August 13, 1948) is an American former professional baseball pitcher, whose baseball career spanned seven seasons, one September of which was spent with the Major League Baseball (MLB) Philadelphia Phillies. Thomason played in one MLB game, pitching an inning for the Phillies, on September 18, 1974. He struck out one batter while also recording two groundouts.

After playing another season in the minors, Thomason worked for the South Carolina Tax Commission, before eventually returning to pitch for the  Reading Phillies.

Early life
Melvin Erskine Thomason was born on August 13, 1948, in Laurens, South Carolina. His mother, Dorothy Cain Thomason, died in child birth, while his father, Furman Erskine Thomason, worked as a farmer. In 1966, Thomason graduated from Laurens High School, where he played football and basketball in addition to baseball. He attended college at Anderson College from 1968 until 1969, and attended Erskine College from 1969 until 1970, graduating with a bachelor's degree in physical education.

Professional career
Thomason was drafted by the Phillies in the 22nd round (516th overall) of the 1970 MLB draft. After signing with the Phillies on June 10, 1970, he began his Minor League Baseball (MiLB) career with the Pulaski Phillies of the Appalachian League in 1970. Thomason also played for the Spartanburg Phillies, Peninsula Phillies, Burlington Rangers, Reading Phillies, and Toledo Mud Hens. His MiLB statistical totals included 54 wins and 47 losses (a win–loss percentage of .535). Thomason posted a 3.40 earned run average (ERA), allowing 443 runs scored, and 883 hits.

Thomason made his Major League debut on September 18, 1974, for the Philadelphia Phillies, in a game against the Chicago Cubs. He pitched in relief of Gene Garber in the top of the ninth inning, recording one strikeout against three batters faced, in a 5–2 Phillies loss.

After retiring from playing baseball, Thomason served as the pitching coach for the Spartanburg Phillies (–). He currently lives in Laurens, South Carolina.

See also
 Philadelphia Phillies all-time roster

References

External links

Erskine Thomason at SABR (Baseball BioProject)

1948 births
Major League Baseball pitchers
Anderson Trojans baseball players
Baseball players from South Carolina
Philadelphia Phillies players
Living people
Reading Phillies players
Toledo Mud Hens players
Spartanburg Phillies players
Burlington Rangers players
Erskine Flying Fleet baseball players
People from Laurens, South Carolina
Pulaski Phillies players
Peninsula Phillies players